The Alamo Ranchhouse, near Steamboat, Nevada, is a historic "plantation style mansion" that was built in 1887.  Also known as the Moffat Ranchhouse, it was listed on the National Register of Historic Places in 1979.  The listing included one contributing building and one contributing structure.

It is significant as the home of John Sparks, governor of Nevada during 1903–08, and later as the home of "cattle baron" William H. Moffat.  It was the center of what was once a  ranch.  The house was moved in 1978.

References 

National Register of Historic Places in Washoe County, Nevada
Houses completed in 1887
Houses on the National Register of Historic Places in Nevada
Houses in Washoe County, Nevada